Jombozeh (also Romanized as Jombezeh; also known as Jonbozeh and Jumbazeh) is a village in Qombovan Rural District, in the Central District of Dehaqan County, Isfahan Province, Iran. At the 2006 census, its population was 192, in 52 families.

References 

Populated places in Dehaqan County